State Highway 117 (abbreviated SH-117) is a state highway in the Tulsa, Oklahoma metropolitan area. The majority of the  highway is in Creek County, with the easternmost  in Tulsa County. SH-117 has one lettered spur in the city of Sapulpa, Oklahoma.

Route description
SH-117 begins at SH-66 just west of Sapulpa. It briefly runs in an arc curving southeast-to-east before heading seven miles (11 km) east. SH-117 ends in Glenpool at US-75.

SH-117 is known as Taft Avenue in Creek County, and 121st Street South in Tulsa County.

History
SH-117 was extended east along US-75, 71st Street South, and Peoria Avenue in Tulsa to Interstate 44 in 1983, coinciding with the imminent opening of the 71st Street bridge across the Arkansas River.  The eastern end was truncated back to its original ending at US-75 before 1990.

Junction list

Spurs

SH-117 has one lettered spur, SH-117A, which connects SH-117 to SH-66 along Mission Street in Sapulpa.

References

117
Transportation in Creek County, Oklahoma
Transportation in Tulsa County, Oklahoma